This is a list of electoral results for the Ballarat Province in Victorian state elections.

Members for Ballarat Province

Election results

Elections in the 2000s

Elections in the 1990s

This election was caused by the vacancy following the resignation of Rob Knowles, who unsuccessfully contested the lower house seat of Gisborne.

Elections in the 1980s

Elections in the 1970s

 This seat was won by Labor in the 1978 by-election, but is recorded as a Liberal party hold.

This by-election was caused by the resignation of Vance Dickie.

Elections in the 1960s

 Two party preferred vote was estimated.

Elections in the 1950s

References

Victoria (Australia) state electoral results by district